Zion Merili (born 11 February 1957 in Jerusalem) is an Israeli former professional association footballer who was part of the 1988–89 championship squad at Maccabi Haifa and the Israel national football team.

Biography

Early life 
Merili grew up in Katamon in an Orthodox Jewish household. Zion would sneak off after going to the synagogue to player football with friends.

Footnotes

References

External links
  Profile and short biography of Zion Merili on Maccabi Haifa's official website

1957 births
Living people
Israeli Jews
Israeli footballers
Association football defenders
Hapoel Jerusalem F.C. players
Maccabi Haifa F.C. players
Israel international footballers
Footballers from Jerusalem